The 2019–20 Mid-American Conference women's basketball season began with practices in October 2019, followed by the start of the 2019–20 NCAA Division I women's basketball season in November. Conference play began in January 2020 and concluded in March 2020. Central Michigan its fourth straight regular season title with a record of 15-1 by three games over Ball State. Micaela Kelly of Central Michigan was named MAC player of the year.

Central Michigan and Ball State were upset in the quarter-finals of the MAC tournament by ninth-seeded Toledo and seventh-seeded Eastern Michigan. They were joined in the semi-finals by Ohio and Kent State. However, the remainder of the tournament was cancelled due to the concerns over the coronavirus pandemic.

Preseason Awards
The preseason coaches' poll and league awards were announced by the league office on October 30, 2019.

Preseason women's basketball coaches poll
(First place votes in parenthesis)

East Division
 Ohio (12) 72
 Buffalo 56
  50 
  32 
  28 
  14

West Division
  60 (4)
  59 (4)
  50 (2)
  35 (1)
 Ball State 30 (1)
  18

Tournament Champs
Ohio (10), Buffalo (1), Northern Illinois (1)

Honors

Postseason

Mid–American Tournament

Postseason Awards

Coach of the Year: Heather Oesterle, Central Michigan 
Player of the Year: Micaela Kelly, Central Michigan 
Freshman of the Year: Dyaisha Fair, Buffalo
Defensive Player of the Year: Cece Hooks, Ohio
Sixth Man of the Year: Gabrielle Bird, Central Michigan

Honors

See also
2019–20 Mid-American Conference men's basketball season

References